Henry Monro (1791–1814) was a British painter, associated with the Monro 'Academy' founded by his father Thomas Monro (1759–1833).

Biography 
According to the History of the Munros, Henry was born in London on 30 August 1791 and educated at Harrow School. He apparently considered joining the Navy and then the Army before finally settling on a career in art, enrolling as a student at the Royal Academy in 1806. He subsequently became the student 'President'. In January 1814 he was "seized with a fatal malady" possible originating as a cold and died less than two months later.

Works 
The following works by Henro Monro are held in public collections in the UK:
 The Disgrace of Cardinal Wolsey - Tate Gallery, London for which he was posthumously awarded a premium of 100 guineas by the British Institution in 1814.
 Thomas Monro - National Portrait Gallery, London
 Thomas Hearne - National Portrait Gallery, London
 Self portrait - Fitzwilliam Museum, Cambridge
 Study of a boy in armour - Fitzwilliam Museum, Cambridge
 Portrait of Edward Thomas Monro - Victoria and Albert Museum, London
 Portrait of Sarah Cox, later Mrs Edward Thomas Monro - Victoria and Albert Museum, London
Four sketches by Henry Monro are held by the Indianapolis Museum of Art.

The following works were exhibited at the Victoria and Albert Museum in 1976, catalogue nos 14-31 inclusive:
 Self portrait (1808) - Black and white chalk on grey paper, 230mm x 180mm
 Boys playing marbles - Black and white chalk on grey paper, 300mm x 430mm
 Boys at Marbles - Pastel, 560mm x 405mm, exhibited at the Royal Academy in 1811 (No 337)
 Hannah Monro (1811), Henry's mother - Pastel, 725mm x 610mm
 Self portrait (1812) - Oil on canvas, 850mm x 700mm, exhibited at the Royal Academy in 1812 (No 40)
 Timbered cottage with figures (Bellis's Farm) - Pen and ink with touches of white chalk, 300mm x 420mm, inscribed on reverse "Wednesday July 15th, 1812"
 The Gardener's Boy - Pen and ink, 215mm x 170mm, inscribed "Monro ft. Feb. 19th, 1813"
 Portrait of a Lascar in a turban - Pen and ink, 310mm x 215mm, inscribed "...Monro fecit March 6th, 1813"
 Self portrait - Pen and ink and watercolour, 290mm x 215mm, inscribed "H. Monro fecit July, 1813"
 Mary Reynett - Pen and ink and watercolour, 210mm x 185mm, inscribed "H. Monro fecit July, 1813"
 Mad Bett - Pen and ink, 310mm x 210mm, inscribed "HM Augt 3rd, 1813"
 Edward Thomas Monro, Henry's older brother also known as 'Tom' 1789-1856 - Pen and ink, 280mm x 185mm, inscribed "Monro fecit Augt. 20th, 1813"
 Dr Thomas Monro and Mrs Monro with other sketches on reverse - Pen and ink on blue paper, 275mm x 180mm
 Dr Thomas Monro - Pastel, 230mm x 180mm
 Dr Thomas Monro and his son Edward Thomas - Pen and ink with traces of white chalk on blue paper, 180mm x 150mm
 Sarah Monro, 'Sally''', Henry's younger sister (d. 1880) - Pencil, 215mm x 145mm
 The Duck Pond - Black and white chalk on grey paper, 255mm x 355mm
 The Disgrace of Cardinal Wolsey - see above
Other works include:
 Othello, Iago and Desdemona'' - exhibited at the Royal Academy in 1813

See also 
 Monro family of physicians

References

Further reading

External links 
 Tate Gallery
 National Portrait Gallery
 Fitzwilliam Museum
 ULAN record for Henry Monro

19th-century British painters
British male painters
1791 births
1814 deaths
People educated at Harrow School
Painters from London
19th-century British male artists